Mark Bussler (born 1975) is an American filmmaker, entrepreneur, and multi-media artist, who is best known for creating the long-running gaming webseries Classic Game Room.

Biography 

Bussler is the son of software entrepreneur Michael Bussler. He graduated from Shady Side Academy in 1994, and earned a business degree, with a concentration on marketing, from Bucknell University in 1998.

Classic Game Room 

Originally titled The Game Room and presented by Bussler and David Crosson, the video game review series launched on November 7, 1999 on the internet startup website FromUSAlive, part-owned by Michael. The pair had met at Pittsburgh Filmmakers School and shared a mutual love of movies and video games.

At first, Bussler and Crosson planned to review mainly then-modern games, but after a segment on older games proved to be popular, the show began reviewing earlier titles. However, the low-budget nature of the show led to slow episode production rates, and when revenue failed to cover the costs of running the show, The Game Room was canceled on October 23, 2000.

The show returned as Classic Game Room HD (HD standing for Heavy Duty according to Bussler) on February 20, 2008, hosted by Bussler. On November 2, 2015, Bussler announced that the show would highly slow its production following the end of the 2015 year. Changes would include the shutting down of the show store and its secondary channel CGR Undertow entirely ending production. Bussler stated that this is due to a change in his life and he would like to focus more on his writing and film-making. He also said that he would continue the show as a hobby similar to how it began for him. Bussler later opened a Patreon for the series at the recommendation of fans in order to keep the series operating as normal, but would be renamed Classic Game Room Mark 3.

On February 5, 2019, Bussler announced he'd be moving away from games and video production, in favor of writing and graphic design. The show was finally cancelled in April, with the Classic Game Room branding repurposed for Bussler's other ventures.

Work
After the initial closure of The Game Room, Bussler directed, wrote and produced multiple direct-to-DVD documentaries, usually on American history.

Films
 Civil War Minutes: Union (2001)
 Left for Dead (2002)
 Shot to Pieces (2002) 
 The Johnstown Flood (2003)
 Gettysburg and Stories of Valor: Civil War Minutes III (2004)
 Expo: Magic of the White City (2005)
 Horses of Gettysburg (2006)
 World War 1: American Legacy (2006)
 Classic Game Room - The Rise and Fall of the Internet's Greatest Video Game Review Show (2007)
 Civil War Minutes: Confederate (2007)
 Westinghouse (2008)
 A Good Time at the 1939 New York World's Fair (2019)

Books

Bussler wrote tie-in non-fiction books to his documentaries such as Expo: Magic of the White City and Horses of Gettysburg, as well as video-game related projects such as The Ultra Massive Video Game Console Guide, How To Make A Video Game Review Show That Doesn't Suck and the CGR Collector's Series.
 Horses of Gettysburg - Published June 23, 2013 
 Expo: Magic of the White City - Published July 2, 2013 
 Westinghouse- The Life & Times of an American Icon - Published July 12, 2013
 Johnstown Flood - Published July 21, 2013 
 CGR Collector's Series 001: Mario Bros. Review for Atari 7800 - Published April 10, 2017 
 How To Make A Video Game Review Show That Doesn't Suck - Published April 20, 2017 
 CGR Collector's Series 002: The Revenge of Shinobi Review for Sega Genesis - Published May 15, 2017 
 Ultra Massive Video Game Console Guide Volume 1 - Published July 24, 2017 
 Ultra Massive Video Game Console Guide Volume 2 - Published October 14, 2017
 Pac-Man Collector's Guide: A Definitive Review - Published October 29, 2017 
 Why Nintendo is Brilliant: NES Classic Edition SNES Classic Edition Plus Review Guide - Published November 8, 2017 
 Classic Game Room's Nintendo Switch Collector's Review Guide - Published November 12, 2017 
 Lost Postcards of World War 1: Volume 1 - Published November 18, 2017 
 The World's Fair of 1893: Ultra Massive Photographic Adventure - Published November 21, 2017
 The White City of Color: 1893 World's Fair - Published November 23, 2017
 Old Timey Pictures With Silly Captions: Volume 1 - Published November 30, 2017

Comics
In 2014, Bussler ran a successful Kickstarter campaign to fund a 76-page hard-cover and digital comic book titled Lord Karnage Book 1. Many of the Kickstarter reward tiers included access to digital downloads of various other Classic Game Room comic books featuring Wind Squid, Edit-Station 1 and Heyzoos the Coked Up Chicken, along with a "Deconstructed" version of Lord Karnage Book 1 containing rough sketches and background information.

In 2017, Bussler announced that another comic, Ethel The Cyborg Ninja, would be available on Amazon. Subsequently, he created a standalone comic of Heyzoos: The Coked Up Chicken, issues dubbed as 'Special Editions', as well as a compilation of old comic strips entitled RetroMegaTrex, and Surf Panda (Bussler's only comic intended for children).
 Ethel the Cyborg Ninja: Book 1 - Published January 16, 2017 
 Lord Karnage Book 1 - Published January 28, 2015
 Heyzoos the Coked-Up Chicken #1 Special Edition - Published February 9, 2017 
 Lord Karnage 1.5 Special Edition - Published May 18, 2017 
 Retromegatrex Volume 1: The Lost Art of Mark Bussler 1995-2017 - Published May 18, 2017 
 Heyzoos the Coked-Up Chicken #2 Special Edition - Published June 8, 2017 
 Surf Panda #1 - Published June 8, 2017

Music
In 2022, Bussler began releasing albums of his own electronic music, under the moniker Turbo Volcano. This spun off into other albums and projects such as Omega Ronin, Robot Kitten Factory and Seatropica.

References

External links
 Mark Bussler on IMDb

1975 births
Living people
American critics
American male writers
American comics artists
American comics writers
American graphic novelists
English-language film directors
Gaming YouTubers
Video game critics
YouTube critics and reviewers